Laurel Lee is an American lawyer and politician.

Laurel Lee may also refer to:

 Laurel Lea, Australian singer
 Laurel Lee (swimmer), Taiwanese swimmer